Oliver Stokowski (born 8 August 1962) is a German film and stage actor. He is best known for his per formance as Schütte - Prisoner No. 82 in Das Experiment. In 2014 he won the Grimme-Preis.

Filmography

References

External links
 

1962 births
Living people
Actors from Kassel
German male film actors
German male television actors
German male stage actors